Nordiidae is a family of nematodes belonging to the order Dorylaimida.

Genera
Genera:
 Actinolaimoides Meyl, 1957
 Acunemella Andrássy, 2002
 Cephalodorylaimus Jairajpuri, 1967
 Dorydorella Andrássy, 1987
 Ecanema Ahmad & Shaheen, 2005
 Echinodorus Siddiqi, 1995
 Enchodeloides Elshishka, Lazarova, Radoslavov, Hristov & Peneva, 2017
 Enchodelus Ahmad & Jairajpuri, 1980
 Enchodelus Thorne, 1939
 Enchodorus Vinciguerra, 1976
 Kochinema Heyns, 1963
 Lanzavecchia Zullini, 1988
 Lenonchium Siddiqi, 1965
 Longidorella Thorne, 1939
 Malekus Thorne, 1974
 Oonaguntus Thorne, 1974
 Oriverutoides Ahmad & Sturhan, 2002
 Papuadorus Andrássy, 2009
 Pungentella Andrássy, 2009
 Pungentus Thorne & Swanger, 1936
 Rhyssocolpus Andrássy, 1971
 Saevadorella Siddiqi, 1982
 Stenodorylaimus Álvarez-Ortega & Peña-Santiago, 2011
 Thornedia Husain & Khan, 1965

References

Nematodes